Shipman is a village in Macoupin County, Illinois, United States. The population was 511 at the 2020 census, down from 624 in 2010.

Geography
Shipman is located in southwestern Macoupin County at  (39.118240, -90.043506). Illinois Route 16 passes through the south side of the village as Railroad Street; it leads east  to Gillespie and west  to Jerseyville.

Demographics

As of the census of 2000, there were 655 people, 249 households, and 181 families residing in the village. The racial makeup of the village was 97.86% White, 0.76% African American, 0.61% Native American, 0.31% Asian, and 0.46% from two or more races. Hispanic or Latino of any race were 0.92% of the population.

There were 249 households, of which 34.9% had children under the age of 18 living with them, 61.0% were married couples living together, 8.4% had a female householder with no husband present, and 27.3% were non-families. 24.5% of all households were made up of individuals, and 14.1% had someone living alone who was 65 years of age or older. The average household size was 2.63 and the average family size was 3.12.

In the village, the population was spread out, with 27.2% under the age of 18, 9.9% from 18 to 24, 26.1% from 25 to 44, 23.8% from 45 to 64, and 13.0% who were 65 years of age or older. The median age was 35 years. For every 100 females, there were 105.3 males. For every 100 females age 18 and over, there were 98.8 males.

The median income for a household in the village was $34,318, and the median income for a family was $41,250. Males had a median income of $31,875 versus $21,786 for females. The per capita income for the village was $15,139. About 7.2% of families and 14.6% of the population were below the poverty line, including 25.1% of those under age 18 and 6.2% of those age 65 or over.

Notable people
Museum registrar Helena M. Weiss was raised in Shipman.

References

Villages in Macoupin County, Illinois
Villages in Illinois